Khryastovo is a rural locality (a village) in Vorshinskoye Rural Settlement, Sobinsky District, Vladimir Oblast, Russia. The population was 74 as of 2010.

Geography 
Khryastovo is located 14 km northeast of Sobinka (the district's administrative centre) by road. Afanasyevo is the nearest rural locality.

References 

Rural localities in Sobinsky District